Stefan Fundić (born 30 June 1994) is a Serbian professional basketball player for Giessen 46ers of the German ProA. Standing at 2.00 m, he plays at the power forward position.

Playing career 
Fundić played for the Beovuk 72 of the Basketball League of Serbia (First League) for three seasons, from 2014 to 2017. In 2016–17 season, he was selected as MVP of the Round for four times. Also, he averaged 17.7 points, 11.8 rebounds per game. On 14 April 2017, Fundić signed for Vršac. He played for Vršac at 2017 Serbian SuperLeague season.

On 12 July 2017, Fundić sign for Mega Bemax of the Adriatic League. He left Mega in August 2019.

On 11 September 2019, he signed with Zadar of the Croatian League and the ABA League.

In June 2020, Fundić signed a two-year contract for a Bosnian team Igokea.

On August 17, 2022, he signed signed with Giessen 46ers of the German ProA.

References

External links 
 Profile at eurobasket.com
 Profile at aba-liga.com

1994 births
Living people
ABA League players
Basketball players from Belgrade
Basketball League of Serbia players
KK Beovuk 72 players
KK Mega Basket players
KK Igokea players
KK Vršac players
KK Zadar players
Power forwards (basketball)
Serbian expatriate basketball people in Bosnia and Herzegovina
Serbian expatriate basketball people in Croatia
Serbian expatriate basketball people in Germany
Serbian men's basketball players